Chigangling station is a subway station in Changsha, Hunan, China, operated by the Changsha subway operator Changsha Metro.

Station layout
The station has one island platform.

History
The station opened on 26 May 2019.

Surrounding area
 Changsha Cigarette Factory

References

Railway stations in Hunan
Railway stations in China opened in 2019